The Alberto Adriani Municipality (better known as El Vigia) is one of the 23 municipalities that makes up the Venezuelan state of Mérida and, according to a 2007 population estimate by the National Institute of Statistics of Venezuela, the municipality has a population of 128,222.  The town of El Vigía is the shire town of the Alberto Adriani Municipality.

Demographics
The Alberto Adriani Municipality, according to a 2007 population estimate by the National Institute of Statistics of Venezuela, has a population of 128,222 (up from 109,215 in 2000). This amounts to 15.2% of the state's population.

Government
The mayor of the Alberto Adriani Municipality is Luis Guillermo Rojas Mendoza, re-elected on October 31, 2004, with 59% of the vote.  The municipality is divided into seven parishes; Presidente Betancourt, Presidente Páez, Presidente Rómulo Gallegos, Gabriel Picón González, Héctor Amable Mora, José Nucete Sardi, and Pulido Méndez.

Transportation
Juan Pablo Pérez Alfonzo Airport serves the town, with six commercial airlines flying to it.

See also
Mérida
Municipalities of Venezuela

References

Municipalities of Mérida (state)